The 2015 West Oxfordshire District Council election took place on 22 May 2015 to elect members of West Oxfordshire District Council in Oxfordshire, England. One third of the council was up for election and the Conservative Party stayed in overall control of the council.

After the election, the composition of the council was:
Conservative 40
Labour 4
Liberal Democrats 4
Independent 1

Background
After the last election in 2014 the Conservatives controlled the council with 40 councillors, while Labour had five seats, the Liberal Democrats had three seats and there was one Independent. 17 seats were contested in 2015, with 2 seats being elected in Hailey, Minster Lovell and Leafield ward after the resignation of a councillor.

Four councillors stood down at the election, Mark Booty, Eve Coles, Hywel Davies and Simon Hoare, while 13 councillors sought re-election. The Conservative, Labour and Liberal Democrat parties each had a full 17 candidates, the Greens had 16 candidates and the UK Independence Party had 14 candidates.

Election result
The Conservatives remained in control of the council with 40 councillors after winning 16 of the 17 seats contested. They gained a seat in Chipping Norton from Labour, but in Charlbury and Finstock Liberal Democrat Andy Graham took the seat from the Conservatives. This left both Labour and the Liberal Democrats with four seats, while there remained one independent councillor. All 13 councillors who stood again were re-elected and overall turnout at the election was 71.58%.

Ward results

By-elections between 2015 and 2016
A by-election was held in Witney North on 20 August 2015 after independent councillor David Snow resigned from the council in June 2015. David Snow had been originally elected as a Conservative but resigned from the party in May 2013. The seat was gained for the Conservatives by Carol Reynolds with a majority of 63 votes over Liberal Democrat Diane West.

References

2015 English local elections
May 2015 events in the United Kingdom
2015
2010s in Oxfordshire